Juan Ignacio Silva (born 9 September 1997) is an Argentine professional footballer who plays as a midfielder for Guillermo Brown.

Career
Silva began with Argentine Primera División side Gimnasia y Esgrima. He was twice an unused substitute during 2015 in games against Estudiantes and Huracán, prior to making his professional debut on 11 May 2015 in a goalless draw against Sarmiento. Silva joined Aldosivi, a fellow Primera División team, on 16 July 2018.

Career statistics
.

References

External links

1997 births
Living people
People from Berisso
Argentine footballers
Association football midfielders
Argentine Primera División players
Primera B Metropolitana players
Club de Gimnasia y Esgrima La Plata footballers
Aldosivi footballers
Club Atlético Villa San Carlos footballers
Guillermo Brown de Puerto Madryn footballers
Sportspeople from Buenos Aires Province